Obelit Yadgar (born 1945), aka Obie Yadgar, is an Assyrian-American radio personality from Glendale, Wisconsin.  

Yadgar was born in Baghdad, Iraq. Raised in Tehran, he moved to the United States in 1957. He was drafted into the US Army's 4th Infantry Division, serving as a combat correspondent in Vietnam in 1967 and 1968.

Yadgar spent eight years at radio station WFMR in Milwaukee during the 1970s, and another 10 years at the station during the late 1980s and early 1990s. He was named "Best Morning Announcer" by Milwaukee Magazine. In 1996 he moved to the Chicago radio station WNIB. In 2002 he moved back to WFMR but was let go during an early-2004 move by the station to satellite-delivered programming.

He contributes to the Assyrian magazine Zinda, and has made appearances on Chicago Public Radio.

References

American radio personalities
Living people
People from Baghdad
Iraqi expatriates in Iran
1945 births
Radio personalities from Milwaukee
People from Glendale, Wisconsin